Kamel Bey El-Assaad (10 February 1932 – 25 July 2010) was a Lebanese politician and za'im (political boss).

Political career 
He served starting early 1960 as Deputy (Member of the Lebanese Parliament) of Bint Jbeil, succeeding his father late Ahmed Asaad and then held the parliamentary seat of Hasbaya-Marjayoun from 1964 and 1992. He was elected Speaker of the Lebanese Parliament several times, May to October 1964, May to October 1968, with his final stint from 1970 to 1984. Assaad chaired the parliamentary sessions, which saw the election of presidents Elias Sarkis, Bachir Gemayel, and Amine Gemayel.

Assaad left politics in 1984 after Syria's intervention in Lebanon's internal political policies related to the ratification of the Agreement of May 17, 1984, between Israel and Lebanon, and the period of political crisis which followed.

He was the founder and president of the Lebanese Social Democratic Party. He also had ministerial positions in two Lebanese governments serving as Minister of Education and Fine Arts from October 1961 to February 1964, and as Minister of Health and Minister of Water and Electricity Resources from April to December 1966.

After serving as a Member of Parliament and its Speaker several times, Assaad later ran for public office but failed to get elected in the Lebanese elections in 1992, 1996 and 2000, in the face of pro-Syrian and pro-Iranian political groups Amal and Hezbollah lists, and called for a boycott of the elections in 2005. He died in 2010, at the age of 78.

Personal life
Coming from a large feudal Shia family 'El Assaad' from southern Lebanon, Kamel Asaad  held the title of "Bakaweit" (title of nobility plural of "Beik" granted to a few wealthy families in Lebanon in the early eighteenth century). He completed his Elementary and Secondary studies at Ecole de la Sagesse in Beirut, and continued with a law degree from the University of Paris.

His father Ahmed al-Asaad preceded his son as speaker of the Lebanese Parliament from June 1951 to May 1953. His mother was Fatima El Assaad.

He married Ghada al Kharsaa and the couple had three children, Ahmed, a son, and Iman and Maha, two daughters. After their divorce, he married Lina Saad with whom he had three more sons: the twin brothers Khalil and Abdellatif and then a third son, Wael.

Lina Kamel El Assaad, his widow, continues to head the Lebanese Social Democratic Party, the party he established.

Kamel El Assaad's son, Ahmed El Assaad, established the political party Lebanese Option. He was a candidate for a seat in the Lebanese Parliament in the elections of 2009, but failed to win against a stronger list of Amal-Hezbollah alliance.

See also
 Lebanese Civil War
 Mountain War (Lebanon)
 Politics of Lebanon

References

1932 births
2010 deaths
University of Paris alumni
Lebanese Shia Muslims
Legislative speakers of Lebanon
Lebanese expatriates in France